Tory Nyhaug (born 17 April 1992) is a Canadian racing cyclist who represents Canada in BMX. He represented Canada at the 2012 and 2016 Summer Olympics in the men's BMX event. He won a silver medal at the World Championships in 2014 and a gold medal at the 2015 Pan American Games in Toronto.

In 2016 he was officially named to Canada's 2016 Olympic team.  In Rio, Nyhaug made the Olympic final and finished 5th.

Nyhaug was born in Canada to a Finnish mother and a Canadian father. Tory announced his retirement from professional cycling on 19 November 2019, due to long term damages sustained from racing injuries.

References

External links
 
 
 
 
 

1992 births
Living people
BMX riders
Canadian male cyclists
Olympic cyclists of Canada
Cyclists at the 2012 Summer Olympics
Cyclists at the 2016 Summer Olympics
Pan American Games gold medalists for Canada
Pan American Games medalists in cycling
Cyclists at the 2015 Pan American Games
Medalists at the 2015 Pan American Games
Canadian people of Finnish descent